Legacy of Sound may refer to:

Music 

 Legacy of Sound (Australian group)
 Legacy of Sound (Swedish group)